Mary Wilson may refer to:
 Mary Wilson, Baroness Wilson of Rievaulx (1916–2018), British poet, wife of Harold Wilson
 Mary Louise Wilson (born 1931), American film, musical theatre, stage and television actress 
 Mary Wilson (singer) (1944–2021), American singer, member of Motown group The Supremes
 Mary Wilson (album), a 1979 album by Mary Wilson
 Mary Wilson, host of Radio New Zealand's Checkpoint news programme
 Mary Ellen Wilson (1864–1956), child abuse victim whose case spurred on the founding of the New York Society for the Prevention of Cruelty to Children
 Mary Wilson (broadcaster), Irish broadcaster and journalist
 Mary Elizabeth Wilson (1893–1963), serial killer known as "the Merry widow of Windy Nook"
 Mary Evans Wilson (1866–1928), Boston civil rights activist
 Mary Ann Wilson (born 1936), American nurse and TV exercise presenter
 Mary Anne Wilson (1802–1867), English opera singer
 Mary Wilson, character in Angels with Broken Wings
 Mary Wilson, widow of Ralph Wilson and leader of the trust that holds ownership of the Buffalo Bills
 Mary Pat Wilson (born 1963), Puerto Rican Olympic skier
 Mary Wilson (politician), Canadian politician
 Mary Florence Wilson (1884–1977), librarian for the League of Nations
 Mary Jane Wilson (1840–1916), founded the Catholic religious order, the Congregation of the Franciscan Sisters of Our Lady of Victories
 Mary Georgina Wade Wilson (1856–1939), Scottish artist

See also
Mari Wilson (born 1954), English singer
Meri Wilson (1949–2002), American singer
Marie Wilson (disambiguation)

Wilson, Mary